General Elections were held in Balochistan on Monday 7 December 1970 to elect 5 Members of the 5th National Assembly of Pakistan. Out of 5 National Assembly seats 4 were General seats and 1 was reserved for women.

National Awami Party (Wali) emerged as the majority party in Balochistan by winning 4 seats, including the seat reserved for women. Jamiat Ulema-e-Islam (West Pakistan) won the other remaining seat and became the 2nd largest party.

Result

By constituency

Notes 

Pakistan
General
General elections in Pakistan